Al Noor Mosque  is a mosque in Sharjah, the United Arab Emirates, located on the Khaled lagoon at the Buhaira Corniche. It is of Turkish Ottoman design and was influenced by the Sultan Ahmed Mosque in Turkey. It is one of the mosques open to the public in Sharjah, which has over 600 total.

In 2014 the mosque set a Guinness World Record for the "World's largest wooden charity box" for their Ramadan donation campaign.

References

External links
 Al Noor Mosque
 Sharjah, Al Noor Mosque. United Arab Emirates. (YouTube)
 Sharjah Light Festival - Al Noor Mosque

Mosques in Sharjah (city)
Mosques completed in 2005